Take All of Me (/ Dedicated to a Star) is an Italian melodrama film written and directed by Luigi Cozzi.

Plot
A young woman named Stella is dying in a hospital of leukemia. A man named Richard Lansky who arrives at the hospital is mistaken for her relative and he is told of Stella's prognosis. The accidental occurrence results in the two forming a romantic relationship in the short period of time Stella has left to live.

Cast 
 Richard Johnson as Richard Lasky
 Pamela Villoresi as  Stella
  Maria Antonietta Beluzzi as  Simone 
 Francesco D'Adda as  The Doctor
 Riccardo Cucciolla as   Stella's father
  Mauro Curi as Stella's brother

Reception
David McGillvray reviewed the film in the Monthly Film Bulletin and stated that the film "pulled out all the stops to contrive a three-handkercheif weepie unsurpassed since the days of Love Story." McGillvray praised the film as "flawlessly photographed by Roberto D'Ettore Piazolli" but found that the film "all too often one's tears are stemmed by the usual doubts. Why, for instance, is Richard so callous to a girl he knows is dying of leukaemia? And why, in particular, does Stella have so much faith in a composer whose ability is clearly limited to writing bland scores of the type that accompanies this film?"

References

Sources

External links

Italian romantic drama films
Films directed by Luigi Cozzi
Films scored by Stelvio Cipriani
1976 romantic drama films
1970s Italian films
1976 films